Manfred Weber (born 14 July 1972) is a German politician who has served as President of the European People's Party (EPP) since 2022 and as Leader of the EPP Group in the European Parliament since 2014. He has been a Member of the European Parliament (MEP) from Germany since 2004. He is a member of the Christian Social Union in Bavaria (CSU), part of the European People's Party.

In the 2003 Bavarian state elections, Weber became the state's youngest parliamentarian at the age of 29. Currently heading the European People's Party Group, he was the youngest group leader in the Parliament at the time of his appointment in 2014, as well as the youngest-ever group leader of the EPP. Weber is known as a moderate politician and power broker in EU politics.

On 5 September 2018, Weber declared his intention to run for the position of President of the European Commission and was elected as the Spitzenkandidat of the EPP on 8 November. On 26 May 2019 Weber's European People's Party won the most seats in the European Parliament, thus making Weber the lead candidate to become the next President of the European Commission. It was announced on 28 May that the new European Commission President would be picked at an EU summit in June; Weber was not nominated, with Ursula von der Leyen selected instead.

Education and early career 
 1996:  engineer, Munich Higher Technical Institute (now Munich University of Applied Sciences)
 1996–2014: Founded own consultancy firm (self-employed)
 2002–2004: Member of the Bavarian Parliament (Other)

Political career

Career in state politics 
Since 2002, Weber has been a member of the Kelheim Regional Council. From 2002 until 2004, he served as Member of the Landtag of Bavaria.

In 2003, Weber succeeded Markus Söder as chairman of the Junge Union in Bavaria; he served in that position until 2007. In this capacity, he also joined the CSU executive board. In 2008, he succeeded Erwin Huber as chairman of the CSU of Lower Bavaria, one of the party's ten districts.

Member of the European Parliament, 2004–present 
Weber served on the European Parliament's Committee on Civil Liberties, Justice and Home Affairs from 2004 until 2012 and on the Committee on Constitutional Affairs from 2012 until 2014. During that time, he was a substitute for the Committee on Regional Development, a member of the Delegation for relations with India, a substitute for the Delegation for relations with the countries of the Andean Community and a substitute on the Subcommittee on Human Rights. As rapporteur, he negotiated in 2008 for the European Parliament Directive on common standards and procedures in Member States for returning illegally staying third-country nationals (Return Directive), the first Directive in the field of home affairs to be adopted through the ordinary legislative procedure.

After his reelection in 2009 Weber became vice-chairman of the European People's Party group in the European Parliament under the leadership of chairman Joseph Daul. In that capacity, he was responsible for setting the political strategy and the policy in the area of Justice and Home affairs.

Weber has been chairing the EPP group since 2014. He has since been a member of the Conference of Presidents of the European Parliament, first under the leadership of Martin Schulz (2014–2017) and later Antonio Tajani (since 2017). Between 2014 and 2016, Weber was a member of the now defunct G5 group along with European Commission President Jean-Claude Juncker, Vice President Frans Timmermans, Socialist group leader Gianni Pittella and Martin Schulz, then President of the European Parliament. In early 2017, Weber established the so-called G6, a group of parliamentary leaders including Pittella as well as Guy Verhofstadt of the Alliance of Liberals and Democrats for Europe (ALDE), Syed Kamall of the European Conservatives and Reformists (ECR), Ska Keller of the Greens, and Gabi Zimmer of the European United Left–Nordic Green Left.

Unsuccessful candidacy for President of the European Commission 
In September 2018, Weber announced his candidacy (Spitzenkandidat) for the post of the President of the European Commission for the 2019 European election. (Under the unofficial Spitzenkandidat system, the leader of the European party that commands the largest coalition in the European Parliament subsequent to an election to the European Parliament is likely to become the European Commission president.)

Weber's European People's Party won a plurality of seats in the European Parliament in May 2019, thus making him the lead candidate to succeed Jean-Claude Juncker as President of the European Commission unless the Spitzenkandidat system was abandoned. On 28 May, leaders of EU governments tasked European Council President Donald Tusk with leading the negotiations with members of the European Parliament and national leaders to pick a new European Commission President at an EU summit in late June 2019. Tusk hinted that Weber was the "lead candidate." This did not materialise with Ursula von der Leyen, a fellow member of the European People's Party, being appointed president.

In September 2021, Weber announced his intention to run for another term as EPP group leader, while at the same time announcing his candidacy to become president of the EPP and succeed incumbent president Donald Tusk.

Role in national politics 
In 2015, Bavaria's Minister President Horst Seehofer nominated Weber as one of his deputies in the office of CSU chairman, making him part of the party's leadership. In the negotiations to form a coalition government under the leadership of Chancellor Angela Merkel following the 2017 federal elections, he was part of the working group on European policy, led by Peter Altmaier, Alexander Dobrindt and Achim Post. Merkel and her government also have backed Weber's bid to become President of the European Commission.

Political positions

European integration 
On 7 June 2014, Weber dismissed demands by British Prime Minister David Cameron to put the brakes on European integration.  Weber stated that "The EU is based on an ever closer union of European peoples. That is set out in the treaties. It is not negotiable for us... We cannot sell the soul of Europe... if we grant every national parliament a veto right, Europe would come to a standstill." However, he supports Cameron's demand that Britain, as a non-euro country, should be empowered to influence eurozone policy decisions. Also, he told The Guardian in early 2015 that the United Kingdom's drive to freeze welfare payments for EU immigrants was justified and set an example for the rest of the union.

In early 2017, Weber held that if the International Monetary Fund (IMF) insisted on debt relief for Greece, it should no longer participate in the bailout, thereby breaking ranks with his political party's official line that the program would end if the IMF pulled out.

Commenting on the UK's vote to leave the European Union, Weber said, "The British people decided to leave this union, so they will not be so comfortable, so safe, not so economically strong. That's why we will say that it really is a very negative day."

As chairman of the European People's Party, the biggest party within the EU Parliament, Weber placed a petition to grant free Interrail tickets to all EU citizens on their 18th birthday. These tickets would allow free travel within all of the EU for one month. Motivating reasons mentioned by Weber: "It is about bringing people together. We must arrange for young people to be thrilled by Europe again." However, the idea would have cost the EU taxpayer subsidies of 2.3 billion euros every year, hence the proposal did not find much support.

Conflicts over Hungary 
In July 2013, when the European Parliament Committee on Civil Liberties, Justice and Home Affairs (LIBE) issued the Tavares Report criticizing the erosion of fundamental rights in Hungary, Weber dismissed it as a politically motivated attack on the government of Hungarian Prime Minister Viktor Orbán by leftist parties. However, in September 2018 he approved the Sargentini report voting to trigger Article 7 of the Treaty on European Union procedure against the government of Hungarian Prime Minister Viktor Orbán. Nevertheless, as head of the group, he failed in preventing a split in the European People's Party group: 115 of its deputies voted in favour of the move, while 57 voted against, with 28 abstentions and 20 stayed away from voting.

In the run-up of the 2019 European Parliament election, Weber could not stop Orbán from his poster campaign targeting European Commission President Jean-Claude Juncker  and billionaire George Soros. Eventually, on 20 March 2019, the EPP suspended the membership of Orban's party Fidesz. When Fidesz withdrew from the EPP under threat of expulsion in March 2021, Weber declared it a "sad day" for the EPP and thanked Fidesz members for their past contributions.

Relations with Russia 
In a 2016 letter to Sigmar Gabriel, German economy minister, and Miguel Arias Cañete, EU energy commissioner, Weber criticized the proposed Nord Stream 2 pipeline project, in that it would undermine the EU's foreign and security goals by increasing dependence on Gazprom, Russia's gas export monopoly. Rather than new supplies across the Baltic, Weber called upon the commission to accelerate its efforts to import more gas across Turkey from the Caspian Sea, and even potentially Iran and Iraq.

In response to the arrest and detention of Alexey Navalny in early 2021, Weber demanded that the EU cut financial transactions from President Vladimir Putin's inner circle.

Gay conversion therapies 
In March 2018, Weber voted against initiatives prohibiting gay conversion therapies, unlike the majority of the European People Party's MEPs.

Other activities 
 European Academy of Bavaria, Member of the Board of Trustees
 Institute for European Politics (IEP), Member of the Board of Trustees
 Central Committee of German Catholics (ZdK), Member
 Friends of Braunau in Rohr Abbey, Chairman
 Katholische Landjugendbewegung, Member

References

External links 

 
 
 
 2019 EP election campaign site

1972 births
Christian Social Union in Bavaria MEPs
Living people
Members of the Landtag of Bavaria
MEPs for Germany 2004–2009
MEPs for Germany 2009–2014
MEPs for Germany 2014–2019
MEPs for Germany 2019–2024
Recipients of the Cross of the Order of Merit of the Federal Republic of Germany
German Roman Catholics